Beach woodball competition at the 2014 Asian Beach Games was held in Phuket, Thailand from 14 to 19 November 2014 at Karon Beach.

Medalists

Stroke

Fairway

Medal table

Results

Stroke

Men's singles
15–19 November

 Ye Qiwei was awarded bronze because of no three-medal sweep per country rule.

Men's team
15–18 November

Women's singles
15–19 November

 Chiang Fang-yu was awarded bronze because of no three-medal sweep per country rule.

Women's team
15–18 November

Fairway

Men's singles
14 November

Men's team

Women's singles
14 November

Women's team

References

External links 
 
Schedule

2014 Asian Beach Games events
2014